John Derek Riley  (July 1, 1922 – May 6, 2018) was a Canadian rower who competed in the 1952 Summer Olympics. Riley was inducted in the Manitoba Sports Hall of Fame and Museum in 2009 and appointed the Order of Canada in 2014.

Early life and education
Riley was born on July 1, 1922 in Winnipeg, Manitoba. He graduated from the University of Manitoba with degrees in commerce and accounting.

Career
Riley began his career as a member of the Royal Canadian Navy in World War II. After starting rowing in the Winnipeg Rowing Club in 1946, Riley competed in rowing competitions for the Royal Canadian Henley Regatta and Northwest International Rowing Association. In RCH competitions, Riley won a juniors competition in 1946 and a seniors competition with Theo Dubois in 1947. Alternatively, Riley won over thirty medals in the NWIRA including a seniors event with Bob Richards in 1948 and every medal competition in 1961. His final NWIRA event was in 1963.

In world competitions, Riley competed at the 1952 Summer Olympics in rowing and was the chairman for the rowing events at the 1967 Pan American Games. Outside of rowing, Riley worked at the Hudson’s Bay Company as a chief financial officer. Later positions included chief executive officer of a Winnipeg metal company and chairman of North West Company in 1987.

Awards and honours
In 2009, Riley was inducted into the Manitoba Sports Hall of Fame and Museum. The following year, he became a member of St. John's-Ravenscourt School's sports hall of fame. In 2014, Riley was appointed the Order of Canada. He died in Winnipeg on May 6, 2018 at the age of 95.

References

External links
 
 

1922 births
2018 deaths
Canadian male rowers
Members of the Order of Canada
Olympic rowers of Canada
Rowers at the 1952 Summer Olympics
Rowers from Winnipeg